Indunil is a Sinhalese given name and surname. Notable people with the name include:

Indunil Herath (born 1993), Sri Lankan middle-distance runner
Thushara Indunil (born 1968), Sri Lankan politician 

Sinhalese masculine given names
Sinhalese surnames